Hyperolius fasciatus is a species of frog in the family Hyperoliidae.

Location
It is endemic to Angola. Its natural habitats are rivers, freshwater marshes, and intermittent freshwater marshes. It is recorded that it breeds in waterbodies and has a larval development breeding strategy.

References

endjami
Endemic fauna of Angola
Taxonomy articles created by Polbot